César Jose Blanco is an American Politician who is currently serving as a member of the Texas Senate.

Early life and education 
Blanco was raised in El Paso by a single mother and graduated from Eastwood High School. Before pursuing a college education, Blanco served in the U.S. Navy as a missile stinger gunner and military intelligence analyst. With the help of the G.I. Bill, he attended the University of Texas at El Paso and graduated with a B.A. in political science with a minor in history.

Career
Blanco's work in politics began when he worked for U.S. Congressman Sivestre Reyes as a caseworker and field representative.

He then served as chief of staff to U.S. Representatives Pete Gallego and Ciro Rodriguez, from Texas's 23rd congressional district. He also worked as a Congressional Relations Officer for the United States Department of Veterans Affairs.

In February 2016, he was named Political Director of the Latino Victory Project, becoming the group's interim president later that year.

Texas House of Representatives 
In 2014, Blanco ran for the Texas House 76th seat and won. He ran unopposed and was reelected in 2016 and in 2018.

For two terms, Blanco served as the whip for the House Democratic Caucus. While for all three of his terms he served as Chairman of the Texas House Border Caucus and was a member of the Mexican American Legislative Caucus and LGBTQ Caucus. In 2017, Blanco served as the Vice-Chair on the House Committee on Defense and Veterans' Affairs.

In 2015, Texas Monthly named him one of the best Texas legislators of the year.

Texas Senate 
In September 2019, State Senator Jose Rodriguez – a Democrat representing Texas's 29th District –  announced that after 10 years in office he would not seek re-election in the upcoming 2020 election. Following the announcement, speculation arose that Blanco would be a potential candidate to succeed Rodriguez with the Latino Victory Fund even launching a campaign encouraging Blanco to run.

Three days after the retirement announcement, Blanco announced his candidacy to replace Rodriguez. In an interview with the El Paso Times, Blanco cited education, healthcare, and infrastructure as his top three priorities.

Blanco defeated Republican candidate and small business owner Bethany Hatch and was elected to the Texas Senate receiving 176,360 votes or 67.3% of the total vote.

Blanco serves on Senate Committee on Health & Human Services; Higher Education; Transportation; Veteran Affairs & Border Security.

In October 2021, Blanco announced his plans to seek re-election and won his re-election campaign in November 2022.

References

External links
 Profile at the Texas Senate
 Cesar Blanco for Texas Senate
 César Blanco at the Texas Tribune

Living people
University of Texas at El Paso alumni
Democratic Party members of the Texas House of Representatives
Hispanic and Latino American state legislators in Texas
Democratic Party Texas state senators
21st-century American politicians
Political chiefs of staff
1976 births